Paano Kita Iibigin is a 2007 Filipino film starring Regine Velasquez and Piolo Pascual, directed by Joyce Bernal. It is their on-screen pairing following "Ang Iibigin Ko'y Ikaw" episode of IBC's defunct weekly drama series Habang May Buhay in 2000 and the "Lobo" episode of ABS-CBN's ongoing weekly drama series Maalaala Mo Kaya in 2001.

Pascual is the main host of ABS-CBN's ASAP which airs opposite GMA's SOP, hosted by Velasquez. Paano Kita Iibigin marked the first time that Pascual worked with Viva Films and the first time that Velasquez worked with Star Cinema. He also remained in Walang Kapalit alongside Claudine Barretto which premeired on April 23 a month later.

Paano Kita Iibigin is the third co-production between Star Cinema and Viva Films after 2006's Wag Kang Lilingon and this year's Ang Cute ng Ina Mo!. This is the third full-length film of Pascual with director Bernal after 2003's Till There Was You and 2006's Don't Give Up on Us. This is the fourth full-length film of Velasquez with director Joyce Bernal after working together in 1998's Dahil May Isang Ikaw, 2000's Kailangan Ko'y Ikaw and 2001's Pangako...Ikaw Lang.

This Philippine-made romantic drama opened on May 30, 2007, in the Philippines. It was rated B by the Cinema Evaluation Board. The movie made P78,128,341. When the DVD was released, it sold 15,000 DVD after two days of sale and became the first Filipino DVD release to be awarded with a Gold Certification in just three days of release. The soundtrack went Gold award after three weeks. The soundtrack reached Double Platinum status with more than 60,000 sales based on Regine's record sales in YES! Magazine's list of the 20 stars who ruled the decade.

The film was digitally restored and remastered in high definition by the ABS-CBN Film Restoration Project and Central Digital Lab. The restored version was released on April 27, 2021, through KTX.ph with a pre-show, hosted by Leo P. Katigbak (head of ABS-CBN Film Archives) with the attendance of the cast members Regine Velasquez, Piolo Pascual, Eugene Domingo, and staff members including writer John Paul Abellera.

Synopsis
Terminated from her job and evicted from her apartment, Martina "Martee" Diamzon (Regine Velasquez) brings herself and her asthmatic son, Liam, to Zambales for a vacation. In a dilapidated resort owned by Lance Monteagundo (Piolo Pascual) and fronted by a motley crew of a resort staff led by Liwayway (Eugene Domingo), she finds work as a manager after Liam accidentally damages Lance's motorcycle. At first, Martee finds it hard to adjust to Lance's abrasive personality and the provincial lifestyle, but she takes the opportunity to escape from her problems back home.

Whenever they work together, Lance and Martee always clash. As they spend more time with each other, they discover other facets of each other's personalities. Martee changes Lance's outlook in life, and he starts to fall for her. At the same time, Martee learns to laugh and enjoy life again.

While Martee seems to be ready to step out of her comfort zone, Lance is not yet ready to give up his "ultimate" plan. When Martee learns of Lance's involvement in a collision that killed his girlfriend and friends, she begins to understand where he's coming from.

However, Lance has an untimely meeting with his dead girlfriend's family. Lance reverts to his old lifestyle. At this point, Martee thinks she can handle this because she truly loves him. When Lance's volatility starts to hurt her son, Martee realizes that this is too much for her. This time, she must choose between love and family. And she must decide if she should follow her heart even when it has already been broken before.

Cast

Main cast

Piolo Pascual as Lance Monteagundo
Regine Velasquez as Martina "Martee" Diamzon

Supporting Cast
Eugene Domingo as Liwayway
Quintin Alianza as Liam
Iya Villania as Tessa 
Erich Gonzales as Guada
Hyubs Azarcon as George 
Rhap Salazar as Lorenzo 
Gian Terry  as Tomas
Paw Diaz as Maureen
Robin Da Roza as Allan 
Beth Tamayo as  Lisa 
Leo Rialp as Simon
Menggie Cobarrubias as Leon 
Mark Bautista as  Raffy 
Roence Santos as  Belinda 
Denise Joaquin as Rosy 
Rico Barrera as  Roy 
Tessie Villarama as  Gilda 
Polly Cadsawan as  Zoilo 
C.J. Javarata as  Dianne 
Maris Dimayuga as Angel 
Jordan Zuniga as  Francis 
Maynard Lapid as  Jojo

Extended cast
JC Cuadrado as Chicoy
Jett Pangan as Mon
Jigo Garcia as Dr. Roxas
Julia Montes as Lance's young sister  
Tess Gonzales as  Janet 
Andy Garcia as Manyakis na Call Center Agent
Krisheela Gonzales as Nina 
Nico Deyro as Nico
Marco Morales as Sean

Cameo appearances
Iñigo Pascual as Young Lance
PJ Valerio as Young Allan
R.J. Yap as Racer's Girlfriend 
Eileen Buencamino as Racer 'sGirlfriend 
Ann Ruffols as Racer'sGirlfriend 
Celine Hizon as Sexy Girl 
Giovan Bernardino as Car Racer 
Alex Perez as Car Racer  
Jimy Mendoza as Asst. Mechanic 
Buds Cabading as Asst. Mechanic 
Erwin Dematera as Toy Plane Operator 
April Rose Alsaca as Nurse 
Edwin Magat as Driver 
Erwin Jacutan as Guada's suitor friend 
Ariel Lugue as Guada's suitor friend 
Mercy Academia as Old Couple 
Carlos Academia as Old Couple 
Jake Yabut as Young Couple 
Kristel Anne Cleopas as Young Couple 
Jomar Dayrit as Judge 
Kisha Carullo as Judge's Secretary 
 Hirochi Ushida as Japanese Buyer 
 Kim Miura as Japanese Buyer 
 Erik Perez as Japanese Buyer 
 Roger Round as American Buyer

Soundtrack
The 12-track OST album contained mostly original songs performed by the lead stars of the movie, Regine Velasquez and Piolo Pascual. The songs were solos and duets, a complete collaboration between the two singer-actors.  The album was produced by the lead actress herself who is an accomplished record producer.  Velasquez also provided back-up vocals on most tracks.

The album contains original songs penned by Ogie Alcasid, Mon Faustino among others.

Paano Kita Iibigin (4:42) - Piolo Pascual & Regine Velasquez
Lalala (3:10) - Piolo Pascual
Paano Kita Iibigin (4:24) - Regine Velasquez
My World With You (3:38) - Piolo Pascual & Regine Velasquez
Manhid (4:22) - Regine Velasquez
With You (4:21) - Piolo Pascual
Muling Magmamahal (4:58) - Piolo Pascual & Regine Velasquez
Tahan (3:04) - Regine Velasquez
Angel Eyes (4:06) - Piolo Pascual
Pare Ko (5:29) - Regine Velasquez
Paano Kita Iibigin (4:42) - Piolo Pascual
Sana Nga (3:51) - Piolo Pascual & Regine Velasquez

Awards and recognitions
56th Filipino Academy of Movie Arts and Sciences Awards (FAMAS Awards) nominations
  ACTOR - Piolo Pascual
  ACTRESS - Regine Velasquez
  ART DIRECTION - Chris Ecker de Guzman
  CHILD ACTOR - Quintin Alianza
  CINEMATOGRAPHY - Charlie Peralta
  EDITING - Marya Ignacio
  MUSICAL SCORE - Raul Mitra
  PICTURE
  SCREENPLAY - John Paul Abellera, Vanessa Valdez and Mel Mendoza-del Rosario
  STORY - John Paul Abellera and Tammy Bejerano-Dinopol
  SUPPORTING ACTOR - Robin da Roza
  SUPPORTING ACTRESS - Eugene Domingo
24th PMPC Star Awards for Movies
 Movie Musical Scorer of the Year - Raul Mitra
 Movie Original Theme Song of the Year - Paano Kita Iibigin (Piolo Pascual and Regine Velasquez)
Nomination for Luna Awards, Best Actress and Best Actor for Regine Velasquez and Piolo Pascual this 2008.

References

External links
Paano Kita Iibigin's Official Movie Website
Paano Kita Iibigin at Multiply.com

The Unofficial Website of the Filipino Academy of Movie Arts and Sciences

Tagalog-language films
2007 films
2007 romantic drama films
Star Cinema films
Viva Films films
Philippine romantic drama films
2000s films
Films directed by Joyce Bernal